Tell Me Who You Are (also known as Min Ye) is a 2009 Malian drama film directed by Souleymane Cissé. It was given a special screening at the 2009 Cannes Film Festival.

Cast
 Assane Kouyate
 Sogona Gakou
 Badra Alou Sissoko

References

External links

2009 films
French drama films
Malian drama films
2009 drama films
Films directed by Souleymane Cissé
2000s French films